Alexander George Cheyne (28 April 1907 – 5 July 1983) was a Scottish footballer who played as an inside forward. He is reputed to have been responsible for the Hampden Roar following his goal in the 'Cheyne International' of 1929.

Playing career

Aberdeen
Cheyne began as a professional for Aberdeen, signing in 1925 from Shettleston Juniors. During his time at Pittodrie he became an idol of the locals, and his goals helped improve the team from regular mid-table finishes to third place in his final season.

Chelsea and Nimes
Cheyne joined David Calderhead's Chelsea in 1930 for a club record fee of £6,000 but, despite playing alongside other talented forwards such as Hughie Gallacher and Alex Jackson, he struggled to settle.

He joined French club Nîmes Olympique in 1932. He returned to Chelsea two years later, finally leaving in 1936.

International
Cheyne won five caps for the Scotland national team, scoring four goals, including a hat-trick against Norway and a goal direct from a corner – a feat which was only legalised the season before – against England. This last is credited with starting the 'Hampden Roar': as Scotland were playing with only ten players and there was less than a minute remaining of the game, the crowd of over 110,000 took up a roar of encouragement, which continued until well after the final whistle and subsequently became a common sound at Scotland home games. Cheyne is reported to have made scoring from corners something of a speciality, having performed the feat twice more for his club side the following season.

Coaching and managerial career
Upon retiring Cheyne moved into coaching, initially with Chelmsford City winning trophies in the Southern Football League. He then became manager of Arbroath, though without success.

Honours
Colchester United
 Southern Football League: 1938–39
 Southern Football League Cup: 1937–38

See also
 List of Scotland national football team hat-tricks

References

External links
 Alec Cheyne at Colchester United Archive Database

1907 births
1983 deaths
Footballers from Glasgow
Scottish footballers
Aberdeen F.C. players
Chelsea F.C. players
Nîmes Olympique players
Colchester United F.C. players
Scotland international footballers
Scottish expatriate footballers
Ligue 1 players
Scottish football managers
Arbroath F.C. managers
Scottish Football League players
Scottish Football League representative players
English Football League players
Association football forwards
Expatriate footballers in France
Scottish expatriate sportspeople in France
Glasgow United F.C. players
Scottish Football League managers
Scottish Junior Football Association players
Chelmsford City F.C. non-playing staff
Association football coaches
Chelmsford City F.C. wartime guest players